Postgraduate Medicine is a bimonthly peer-reviewed medical journal published by Informa Healthcare. It was established in 1916 with Charles William Mayo as its first editor-in-chief. The current editor-in-chief is Howard A. Miller (Drexel University College of Medicine). The journal is directed towards primary care physicians. It is abstracted and indexed in Index Medicus/MEDLINE/PubMed, the Science Citation Index, and Current Contents/Clinical Medicine.

References

External links 
 

English-language journals
General medical journals
Bimonthly journals
Publications established in 1916
Taylor & Francis academic journals